Amarsinh Rathwa (1942–1990) is an Indian politician. He was elected to the Lok Sabha, lower house of the Parliament of India from Chhota Udaipur, Gujarat as a member of the Indian National Congress.

References

External links
 Official Biographical Sketch in Lok Sabha Website

1942 births
1990 deaths
India MPs 1977–1979
India MPs 1980–1984
India MPs 1984–1989
Lok Sabha members from Gujarat
Indian National Congress politicians
Indian National Congress politicians from Gujarat